18th BSFC Awards
December 14, 1997

Best Film: 
 L.A. Confidential 
The 18th Boston Society of Film Critics Awards honored the best films of 1997. The awards were given on 14 December 1997.

Winners

Best Film 
1. L.A. Confidential
2. The Sweet Hereafter
3. Donnie Brasco

Best Actor 
Al Pacino – Donnie Brasco

Best Actress 
1. Helena Bonham Carter – The Wings of the Dove
2. Katrin Cartlidge – Career Girls
3. Tilda Swinton – Female Perversions

Best Supporting Actor 
1. Kevin Spacey – L.A. Confidential
2. Burt Reynolds – Boogie Nights
3. Robert Downey Jr. – One Night Stand

Best Supporting Actress 
1. Sarah Polley – The Sweet Hereafter
2. Joan Cusack – In & Out
3. Alison Elliott – The Wings of the Dove

Best Director 
1. Curtis Hanson – L.A. Confidential
2. Atom Egoyan – The Sweet Hereafter
3. Mike Newell – Donnie Brasco

Best Screenplay 
1. Curtis Hanson and Brian Helgeland – L.A. Confidential
2. Kevin Smith – Chasing Amy
3. Matt Damon and Ben Affleck – Good Will Hunting

Best Cinematography 
1. Roger Deakins – Kundun
2. Eduardo Serra – The Wings of the Dove
3. Paul Sarossy – The Sweet Hereafter

Best Documentary 
1. Fast, Cheap & Out of Control
2. Sick: The Life & Death of Bob Flanagan, Supermasochist
3. Message to Love: The Isle of Wight Festival

Best Foreign-Language Film 
1. Underground • France/Federal Republic of Yugoslavia/Germany/Bulgaria/Hungary
2. Shall We Dance? (Shall we dansu?) • Japan
3. Irma Vep • France

Best New Filmmaker 
Paul Thomas Anderson – Hard Eight and Boogie Nights

External links
Past Winners

References
Boston film critics extend streak of `L.A. Confidential' The Boston Globe
Noir thriller is big Boston crix winner The Variety
1997 Boston Society of Film Critics Awards Internet Movie Database

1997
1997 film awards
1997 awards in the United States
1997 in Boston
December 1997 events in the United States